Jesús de Tavarangue was a Jesuit Reduction located in what is now Itapua, Paraguay. The ruins of the mission, together with those of Trinidad were designated a UN World Heritage Site designated in 1993.

History

The Reducción de Jesús was initially founded in what is now Alto Parana in 1685 near the Monday river. The mission was relocated several times before arriving in its current location in 1760. Construction of the mission was not completed by the time the Jesuit order was expelled from Paraguay in 1767. The massive mission church was being built as a replica of the Church of Saint Ignatius of Loyola in Italy.

Visiting the ruins

The Jesuit Ruins in Paraguay are possibly the best preserved in South America and include the Jesús, San Cosme y Damián and Trinidad Missions.

Route No. 6 from Encarnación passes between the ruins of Jesus and Trinidad. Signs mark entrances to both sites. Access to the ruins of the ruins Jesús de Tavarangue is a paved road about 100m from the entrance to Trinidad at “km 31” from Encarncación.

See also
 Jesuit Reductions
 Spanish missions in South America
 La Santísima Trinidad de Paraná
 Jesuit Missions of La Santísima Trinidad de Paraná and Jesús de Tavarangue
 History of Paraguay
 Guarani people
 List of Jesuit sites

References

 La Magia de nuestra tierra. Fundación en Alianza. Asunción. 2007
 Corazonez. org
 Ricon del Vago

External links
 Testimonio Arqueologicos
 Galería de imágenes SG-SAG
 FACULTAS PHILOSOPHICA

Spanish missions in Paraguay
Ruins in Paraguay
Jesuit history in South America
Tourism in Paraguay
Spanish Colonial architecture
Itapúa Department
Roman Catholic churches in Paraguay
World Heritage Sites in Paraguay

cs:Jezuitské misie La Santísima Trinidad del Paraná a Jesús de Tavarangué
es:Ruinas jesuíticas de Jesús y Trinidad